Mandalay Central railway station, located in downtown Mandalay, is one of the largest rail stations in Myanmar. The station is Upper Myanmar's gateway to the 3,126-mile (5,031 km) national rail network. It is 
the terminus of the main rail line from Yangon and the starting point of branch lines to Pyin U Lwin (Maymyo), Lashio, Monywa, Pakokku, Kalay, Gangaw, and to the north, Shwebo, Kawlin, Naba, Kanbalu, Mohnyin, Hopin, Mogaung and Myitkyina.

The station is located in a recently built seven-story complex which includes a hotel. The old station is located farther south of the new station.

References

Mandalay
Railway stations in Myanmar